Girls Next Door was an American country music group formed in Nashville, Tennessee, in 1982 and disbanded in 1991. The group consisted of Doris King, Cindy Nixon, Diane Williams, and Tammy Stephens. The group recorded three albums.

History
Girls Next Door was founded in 1982 by record producer Tommy West, who suggested that studio backing vocalist Doris King form a four-woman vocal group. They were previously known as Belle and Wildflower. Girls Next Door recorded two albums for MTM Records and one for Atlantic Records, in addition to charting nine singles on the U.S. country charts. Their most successful song was "Slow Boat to China", which reached number 8 on the country charts in 1986.

The original four members reunited for one concert in 2011. On August 1, 2022, the group's official Facebook page has announced that the group has reunited and is working on a new album and a tour.

Discography

Albums

Singles

Music videos

References

Country music groups from Tennessee
American girl groups
Musical groups established in 1982
Musical groups from Nashville, Tennessee
Atlantic Records artists
MTM Records artists
1982 establishments in Tennessee